Oscar Schmidt (born 1958) is a Brazilian retired basketball player.

Oscar Schmidt may also refer to:

Oscar Schmidt Inc., musical instrument manufacturer based in New Jersey
Oscar Schmidt Jr. (1896–1973), United States Navy sailor and Medal of Honor recipient
Eduard Oscar Schmidt (1823–1886), German zoologist
Oskar Schmidt (ice hockey) (born 1908), Swiss ice hockey player